USS Nanticoke may refer to the following ships operated by the United States Navy:

 , was a gasoline tanker launched in 1945 and eventually acquired by the Argentine Navy serving there until 1985
 , was a large harbor tug launched in 1969 and struck in 1999

United States Navy ship names